The Amazing Race 7 is the seventh season of the American reality television show The Amazing Race. It featured eleven teams of two competing in a race around the world.

The season premiered on CBS March 1, 2005, and concluded on May 10, 2005.

Married couple Uchenna and Joyce Agu were the winners of this season, while engaged couple Rob Mariano and Amber Brkich (of Survivor fame) finished in second place, and dating couple Ron Young, Jr. and Kelly McCorkle finished in third.

Production

Development and filming

Filming began on November 20, 2004, and finished on December 19, 2004. The teams raced in ten countries, five of which were not previously visited on the series: Peru, Chile, Botswana, Turkey, and Jamaica. Puerto Rico, a U.S. territory in the Caribbean, was also visited for the first time.

This was the first edition of The Amazing Race to not circumnavigate the world by traveling continuously either west or east while crossing each meridian. Once teams traveled as far east as India, they returned to the United States by traveling westward through Europe and the Caribbean.

In this season, a change was made to the non-elimination leg penalty. In addition to being stripped of all their money and receiving no allowance for the next leg, teams were forced to surrender all of their possessions, except for their passports and the clothes they were wearing, for the remainder of the season. They were also no longer allowed to beg for money prior to the start of the next leg. The racers could receive or buy clothing or toiletries from the other teams.

Leg 3 featured a difficult Roadblock in which players had to eat  of meat and organs. Three players quit this food-eating task: Rob, Meredith, and Deana; the most to ever quit a task in a single leg at the time.

Host Phil Keoghan greeted teams at the check-in mat midway through Leg 8 to hand them their next clue, marking the first time on The Amazing Race that teams stepped on the check in mat only to be handed their next clue, or to have their next clue handed to them by Keoghan.

Controversy surrounded the final leg of the season when Rob & Amber and Uchenna & Joyce arrived at the airport in San Juan. They were both sold tickets for a flight leaving later than one whose gate was about to close. While Rob & Amber managed to get on this earlier departing flight, Uchenna & Joyce were shown through the gate as the boarding corridor between the gate and airplane began to shut. After a commercial break, the boarding corridor reopened to the gate to pick up Uchenna & Joyce. No explanation was given as to why the gate reopened, which has led to widespread speculation about intervention by the production staff. In the "Revisiting the Race" special feature on the Season 7 DVD, Uchenna, Rob, and host Phil Keoghan denied the accusations of intervention by the production crew. Uchenna described his experience of finding the same airline agent at the gate who had previously informed him that there was no earlier available flight. Rob described Uchenna running around frantically trying to get onto the flight, which the final edited version of the show did not portray. Phil cited the fact that the decision to reopen the door rested solely with the pilot, and that intervention by the production crew would have resulted in someone leaking such information out.

Awards
In September 2005, The Amazing Race 7 won the Primetime Emmy Award for Outstanding Reality-Competition Program, the third consecutive award for the television series. Although seasons 5 and 6 were also eligible, producers chose season 7 since it was the most recent installment of the show.

Cast

Joyce Agu (credited as Joyce Robinson) previously appeared on Star Trek: The Next Generation in a recurring role as Ensign Gates. Ron Young was a former Apache helicopter pilot who was shot down in Iraq and held as a prisoner of war for 22 days, and Kelly McCorkle was a former Miss South Carolina. Brian Thomas Smith previously competed on Christmas Fear Factor. Amber Brkich originally appeared on Survivor: The Australian Outback and Rob Mariano appeared on Survivor: Marquesas. Both also competed on Survivor: All-Stars where they got engaged at the live finale.

Future appearances
Rob & Amber and Uchenna & Joyce were selected for The Amazing Race: All-Stars.

On May 25, 2005, CBS aired Rob & Amber's wedding at Atlantis Paradise Island in Nassau, The Bahamas, a trip they won during the season, during a special entitled Rob and Amber Get Married. After competing on The Amazing Race, Rob later competed on Survivor: Heroes vs. Villains, Survivor: Redemption Island, and served as a non-playing mentor on Survivor: Island of the Idols. Rob & Amber also both returned to compete on Survivor: Winners at War. On May 23, 2016, Rob also appeared on a Survivor-themed primetime special of The Price is Right.

Results
The following teams are listed with their placements in each leg. Placements are listed in finishing order. 
A  placement with a dagger indicates that the team was eliminated. 
An  placement with a double-dagger indicates that the team was the last to arrive at a pit stop in a non-elimination leg. As a penalty, they were stripped of their money, bags, and possessions other than their passports and the clothes they had on upon checking in, and they received no money at the start of the next leg.
A  indicates that the team won the Fast Forward. 
 An italicized placement means it is a team's placement at the midpoint of a double leg.
A  indicates that the team used the Yield and a  indicates the team on the receiving end of the Yield.

Notes

Race summary

Leg 1 (United States → Peru)

Episode 1: "Courteous? This Is a Race!" (March 1, 2005)
Prize: US$10,000 cash for each racer (awarded to Debbie & Bianca)
Eliminated: Ryan & Chuck
Locations
Long Beach, California (Shoreline Aquatic Park) (Starting Line)
 Los Angeles → Lima, Peru
 Lima (Plaza de Armas)
 Lima (Ancón)
 Ancón (Playa Hermosa)
 Lima → Cusco
Cusco (Alejandro Velasco Astete International Airport)
Huambutio (Virgen del Carmen Kiosk)
Huambutio (Gorge) 
Huambutio (Police Station)
Písac (Písac Market)
Cusco (Convento de la Merced) 
Episode summary
Teams set off from Long Beach, California, and made their way to Los Angeles International Airport, where they had to book one of two flights to Lima, Peru. The six teams on the American Airlines flight arrived 85 minutes before the remaining five teams on the United Airlines flight. Once in Lima, teams had to travel by bus to Plaza de Armas in order to find their next clue, which directed teams to travel by bus to Ancón.
After arriving in Ancón, teams rode a rickshaw to Playa Hermosa. On the beach, teams had to search through three sand piles for a set of LAN airline tickets leaving the next morning to Cusco. The second flight to Cusco was delayed due to technical difficulties and the four teams with tickets on that flight were booked onto the third flight, which departed 1:40 hours after the first. 
Once in Cusco, teams found their next clue outside the airport, which instructed them to travel via taxi to Huambutio and receive another clue from the owner of a marked kiosk. From there, teams continued to the top of a gorge, where they rode two zip-lines to the bottom of the gorge in order to receive their next clue.
 This season's first Detour was a choice between Rope a Llama or Rope a Basket. In Rope a Llama, teams had to rope two llamas and lead them to a nearby pen in order to receive their next clue. In Rope a Basket, each team member had to carry a  basket of alfalfa two-thirds of a mile (1.1 km) to a store in order to receive their next clue.
After completing the Detour, teams went to the Huambutio Police Station and boarded delivery trucks, which departed every 20 minutes and could transport no more than three teams per truck. When the trucks arrived in Písac, teams had to search the local market to find their next clue, which directed them to the pit stop: the Convento de la Merced in Cusco.

Leg 2 (Peru → Chile)

Episode 2: "The Whole Country Hates Me" (March 8, 2005)
Prize: A trip to Atlantis Paradise Island in the Bahamas (awarded to Rob & Amber)
Eliminated: Megan & Heidi
Locations
Cusco (Convento de La Merced) 
 Cusco → Arequipa
Arequipa (Sindicato Único de Lustradores de Calzado) 
 Arequipa → Santiago, Chile
 Santiago (San Cristóbal Hill – Virgin Mary Statue)
Santiago (Mercado Central  Libreria Chilena & Library of Congress of Chile) 
Santiago (Cerro Santa Lucía – Neptune Fountain ) 
Episode summary
At the beginning of this leg, teams were instructed to travel by bus to Arequipa. Once in Arequipa, teams had to search for the Sindicato Único de Lustradores de Calzado in order to find their next clue.
 In this season's first Roadblock, one team member had to work as a shoeshiner and polish five pairs of shoes on the street for a fee of one Peruvian sol per pair. After earning five sols, racers had to find their partner at the shoeshine union headquarters in order to receive their next clue.
Based on the order that team members finished the Roadblock, teams were given plane tickets for one of two flights to Santiago, Chile, each of which carried five teams and departed forty-five minutes apart. Once in Santiago, teams had to travel to San Cristóbal Hill and ride the funicular to the Virgin Mary Statue in order to find their next clue.
 This leg's Detour was a choice between Shop or Schlep. In Shop, teams had to travel to the Mercado Central and find the Donde Augusto restaurant, where the chef gave them a shopping list. Teams then had to buy the proper quantities of five ingredients on the shopping list in order to receive their next clue from the chef. In Schlep, teams had to travel to the Libreria Chilena, load 180 books onto a hand truck, deliver the books eight blocks to the Library of Congress of Chile inside the Former National Congress Building, and then place the books on a designated shelf in order to receive their next clue.
Teams had to check in at the pit stop: the Neptune Fountain at Cerro Santa Lucía in Santiago.
Additional notes
Chilean model Pamela Díaz appeared as the pit stop greeter in this leg.

Leg 3 (Chile → Argentina)

Episode 3: "Do You Need Some Mouth-to-Mouth Resuscitation?" (March 15, 2005)
Eliminated: Debbie & Bianca
Locations
Santiago (Cerro Santa Lucía – Neptune Fountain ) 
Santiago (Paseo Bulnes)
Uspallata, Argentina (Puente Viejo) 
El Challao (Camping Suizo) 
Las Heras Department (Estancia San Isidro) 
Episode summary
At the start of this leg, teams found their next clue at the Paseo Bulnes in Santiago, which instructed them to drive themselves through the Andes Mountains to Argentina, and find their next clue at Puente Viejo.
 This leg's Detour was a choice between Paddle or Pedal. In Paddle, teams had to whitewater raft  down the Mendoza River to their next clue. In Pedal, teams had to pedal mountain bikes  down a railroad track to their next clue.
After completing the Detour, teams had to drive to Camping Suizo in El Challao in order to find their next clue.
 In this leg's Roadblock, one team member had to eat a  traditional Argentine feast containing cow ribs, pork sausage, blood sausage, cow intestines, udder, kidney, and part of a salivary gland in order to receive their next clue.
Teams had to check in at the pit stop: the Estancia San Isidro.
Additional notes
Rob & Amber, Ray & Deana, and Meredith & Gretchen incurred four-hour penalties each because Rob, Deana, and Meredith elected to quit the Roadblock.
Debbie & Bianca fell five hours behind the other teams after they made a wrong turn while trying to drive to Argentina and wound up on the Chilean coastline instead.

Leg 4 (Argentina)

Episode 4: "What a Gaucho You Are!" (March 22, 2005)
Prize: A trip to London, England (awarded to Rob & Amber)
Eliminated: Susan & Patrick
Locations
Las Heras Department (Estancia San Isidro) 
Lunlunta (Cabaña La Guatana Gaucho Ranch) 
 Mendoza → Buenos Aires
Buenos Aires (Plaza de la Fuerza Aérea  – English Clock Tower)
 Buenos Aires → Tigre
Tigre (700 Lavalle – Docks) 
Vicente Casares (La Martina Polo Ranch) 
Episode summary
At the beginning of this leg, teams had to drive to the Cabaña La Guatana Gaucho Ranch in Lunlunta, where they found their next clue.
 In this leg's Roadblock, one team member had to complete a traditional gaucho challenge by riding a horse through a barrel racing course and then use a stick to spear a ring within 40 seconds in order to receive their next clue.
After completing the Roadblock, teams had to drive to the Mendoza Airport and take one of two flights departing five hours apart to Buenos Aires. Once there, teams had to make their way to the English Clock Tower in Plaza de la Fuerza Aérea and find a man in a raincoat with their next clue. Teams were instructed to travel by train to Tigre and search the docks for their next clue.
 This leg's Detour was a choice between Shipwreck or Island. In Shipwreck, teams had to find an abandoned ship within a  area, using only a 30-year-old picture as a reference, in order to receive their next clue. In Island, teams used a map to travel  up the San Antonio River in order to find an island with their next clue.
Teams had to check in at the pit stop: La Martina Polo Ranch in Vicente Casares.

Leg 5 (Argentina → South Africa)

Episode 5: "I've Been Wanting a Face-Lift for a Long Time" (March 29, 2005)
Prize: Two Toyota RAV4 vehicles (awarded to Ray & Deana)
Locations
Vicente Casares (La Martina Polo Ranch) 
 Buenos Aires → Johannesburg, South Africa
Johannesburg (Johannesburg International Airport)
Soweto (Orlando Cooling Towers) 
Krugersdorp (Wild Cave Adventures)  Broederstroom (Lesedi Cultural Village) 
Soweto (Baragwanath Market) 
Soweto (Orlando Children's Home)
Soweto (Ngakane Street – Soweto Overlook) 
Episode summary
At the beginning of this leg, teams were instructed to fly to Johannesburg, South Africa. Once there, teams had to search Johannesburg International Airport for a marked car with their next clue.
 This season's first Fast Forward required one team to go to the Orlando Power Station in Soweto. There, they had to walk across one of the cooling towers on a suspension bridge 30 stories above the ground. Ray & Deana won the Fast Forward.
 This leg's Detour was a choice between Tunnels or Tribes. In Tunnels, teams went to Wild Cave Adventures in Krugersdorp, where they had to rappel  into a dark cave and search for their next clue. In Tribes, teams traveled to the Lesedi Cultural Village in Broederstroom, where they found five objects and had to deliver the correct item to each of the village's five tribes. For every correct item delivered, a chief gave them a necklace. Once teams had all five necklaces, they could exchange them for their next clue.
After completing the Detour, teams had to make their way to the Baragwanath Market in Soweto in order to find their next clue.
 In this leg's Roadblock, one team member had to search the Baragwanath Market and buy five items from vendors in order to receive their next clue.
After completing the Roadblock, teams had to deliver their purchased items to the Orlando Children's Home in order to receive their next clue, which directed them to the pit stop: the Soweto Overlook on Ngakane Street.
Additional notes
This was a non-elimination leg.

Leg 6 (South Africa → Botswana)

Episode 6: "We're Moving Up the Food Chain" (March 29, 2005)
Eliminated: Ray & Deana
Locations
Soweto (Ngakane Street – Soweto Overlook) 
Krugersdorp (Rhino & Lion Nature Reserve)
 Johannesburg → Gaborone, Botswana
 Gaborone → Francistown
 Francistown → Gweta (Giant Aardvark) 
Xau Xarra (Cattle Post) 
Makgadikgadi Pans National Park (Makgadikgadi Pans) 
Episode summary
At the beginning of this leg, teams were instructed to travel to the Rhino & Lion Nature Reserve in Krugersdorp. There, teams had to sign up for one of two shuttles departing one hour apart that took them through the reserve, where they had to help feed the lions in order to receive their next clue, which instructed them to fly to Gaborone, Botswana. Once in Botswana, teams had to travel by train and bus to a giant aardvark statue near Gweta in order to find their next clue.
 In this leg's Roadblock, one team member had to complete a traditional bushman hunting exercise by throwing a spear  into a swinging bag to receive their next clue.
After completing the Roadblock, teams had to drive themselves along a marked road to a cattle post at Xau Xarra, where they found their next clue.
 This leg's Detour was a choice between Food or Water. In Food, teams had to use two sticks and a wooden container called a kika to pound enough corn into powder so as to fill a basket in order to receive their next clue. In Water, teams had to fill 12 ostrich egg shells with water from an underground spring using reed straws and then bury them in order to receive their next clue.
After completing the Detour, teams had to drive themselves along a marked road to the Makgadikgadi Pans on the edge of the Kalahari Desert in order to find the pit stop.
Additional notes
Legs 5 and 6 aired back-to-back as a special two-hour episode.

Leg 7 (Botswana)

Episode 7: "Houston, We Have an Elephant!" (April 5, 2005)
Prize: A trip to Monaco (awarded to Rob & Amber)
Eliminated: Brian & Greg
Locations
Makgadikgadi Pans National Park (Makgadikgadi Pans) 
Sankuyo Village (Water Tower) 
Khwai (Khwai River) 
Khwai (Khwai River Lodge) 
Episode summary
At the start of this leg, teams had to drive themselves through Maun and then continue to Sankuyo Village, where they found their next clue beneath a water tower.
 This leg's Detour was a choice between Carry It or Milk It. In Milk It, teams had to select up to four goats from a pen and milk them until they filled a  cup in order to receive their next clue.
 In this leg's Roadblock, one team member had to drive their vehicle across a crocodile-inhabited crossing of the Khwai River. They then had to choose a marked path by removing a flagged post and use their vehicle to remove two trees felled by elephants before retrieving their next clue at the end of the path.
Teams had to check in at the pit stop: the Khwai River Lodge.

Leg 8 (Botswana → India)

Episode 8: "Mow'em Down, Like Grass" (April 12, 2005)& Episode 9: "We Have a Bad Elephant" (April 19, 2005)
Eliminated: Lynn & Alex
Locations
Khwai (Khwai River Lodge) 
 Khwai → Francistown
 Francistown → Lucknow, India
Lucknow (Bara Imambara)
Lucknow (Kohinoor Steel Emporium) 
 Lucknow (Aishbagh – Indane Bhushan Gas Service)
Lucknow (Mehrotra Coal Depot & K.K. Jaiswal Charcoal Merchants  Sharma Tea Corner & Nagar Nigam Office) 
Lucknow (Charbagh Multistory Flats) 
 Lucknow → Jodhpur
Jodhpur (Sardar Market)
Jodhpur (Kailashoham Gaure Shwar Mahadev Mandir) 
Jodhpur (Panna Niwas & Shri Kunj Bihari Temple  Dyeing House) 
Jodhpur (Deora Krishi Farm) 
Jodhpur (Jaswant Thada) 
Episode summary (Episode 8)
At the beginning of this leg, teams were instructed to fly to Lucknow, India. To reach Lucknow, teams were required to sign up for one of three charter flights to Francistown, where they booked tickets to Mumbai, India, and then a connecting flight to Lucknow. After arriving in Lucknow, teams had to travel to Bara Imambara, where they had to don a head cover or headscarf and search the Bouli in order to find their next clue.
From Bara Imambara, teams had to travel by horse-drawn tonga to the Kohinoor Steel Emporium in order to find their next clue.
 In this leg's first Roadblock, one team member had to search among 600 metal boxes in the emporium for one of ten which contained their next clue.
After completing the first Roadblock, teams had to travel by cycle rickshaw to Indane Bhushan Gas Service in order to find their next clue.
 This leg's first Detour was a choice between Solid or Liquid. In Solid, teams traveled to Mehrotra Coal Depot, where they had to break up  of coal, load it onto flatbed tricycles, and then deliver it to K.K. Jaiswal Charcoal Merchants in order to receive their next clue. In Liquid, teams traveled to the Sharma Tea Corner, where they chose a tea cart and pushed it to a three-story office building, where they had to find five people from a list of ten and exchange cups of tea for their business cards. When they received five business cards, teams had to return the carts to the tea shop and exchange the cards with the owner for their next clue.
Teams then had to travel to the rooftop of the Charbagh Multistory Flats. There, teams met Phil, who told them that the leg was not over before handing them their next clue.
Episode summary (Episode 9)
Teams' next clue instructed them to travel across the street to the train station and board an overnight train to a mystery destination. While on the train, a porter delivered their next clue, which directed them to search the train station in Jodhpur for their next clue. From there, teams had to travel to Sardar Market, where they found their next clue at the top of the clock tower.
 This season's second Fast Forward required one team to have their heads completely shaved at the Kailashoham Gaure Shwar Mahadev Mandir on Kaylana Lake. Uchenna & Joyce won the Fast Forward.
 This leg's second Detour was a choice between Trunk or Dunk. In Trunk, teams had to travel to Panna Niwas and then push a  teak elephant  through the streets of Jodhpur's old city to the Shri Kunj Bihari Temple, where they received their next clue. In Dunk, teams made their way to a dyeing house, where they had to dye 25 sheets of fabric until they found the one imprinted with their next clue.
 In this leg's second Roadblock, one team member had to complete two laps in a camel-driven cart in order to receive their next clue.
Teams had to check in at the pit stop: the Jaswant Thada in Jodhpur.
Additional notes
The head-shaving task was later revisited on season 20 as a Switchback. 
Leg 8 was a double leg, spread over two episodes.

Leg 9 (India → Turkey)

Episode 10: "We Got a Gnome! We Got a Gnome!" (April 26, 2005)
Prize: A $20,000 shopping spree on Travelocity.com and a stay in a first-class suite at the Four Seasons Hotel during the pit stop (awarded to Ron & Kelly)
Locations
Jodhpur (Jaswant Thada) 
 Jodhpur → Istanbul, Turkey
 Istanbul → Eminönü
 Eminönü → Kız Kulesi
Istanbul (Galata Kulesi)
Istanbul (Fatih – Binbirdirek Cistern  Eminönü – Yeni Mosque) 
Istanbul (Rumeli Hisarı)  
Episode summary
At the beginning of this leg, teams were instructed to fly to Istanbul, Turkey. Once in Istanbul, teams traveled by train and ferry to the Kız Kulesi, where they found their next clue directing them to search for one of four Travelocity Roaming Gnomes that they had to carry for the duration of the leg. Teams then traveled to Galata Kulesi in order to find their next clue.
 This leg's Detour was a choice between Columns or Kilos. In Columns, teams traveled to Binbirdirek Cistern and had use a map with coordinates to find four columns, each of which had a number for the combination needed to open a padlocked box which contained their next clue. In Kilos, teams had to travel to the Yeni Mosque, located at the old Jewish quarter of Eminönü, and find a man with a box of scales. When they were finished, teams had to return their scale and show their weights in order to receive their next clue.
After completing the Detour, teams had to make their way to Rumeli Hisarı in order to find their next clue.
 In this leg's Roadblock, one team member had to climb a  ladder up the side of Halil Paşa Kulesi. There, they had to climb to the top of a tower to retrieve a key and then rappel down the side of Sarlica Paşa Kulesi. At the bottom, they had to use the key to open a book which contained their next clue. They were instructed to have the guard open the gate in order to allow their partner to enter the castle and then teams then had to search the grounds for the pit stop.
Additional notes
Ron & Kelly chose the special gnome which allowed them to win the prize once they reached the pit stop.
This was a non-elimination leg.

Leg 10 (Turkey → England)

Episode 11: "The Devil Made Me Do It" (May 3, 2005)
Prize: A home entertainment system for each team member (awarded to Rob & Amber)
Eliminated: Meredith & Gretchen
Locations
Istanbul (Rumeli Hisarı) 
Istanbul (Sirkeci Train Station)
 Istanbul → London, England
London (Abbey Road)
London (London Eye)
London (London Marriott Hotel County Hall)
London (London Underground  Battersea Park) 
London (Millennium Dome – North Greenwich Coach Park)  
London (Potters Fields Park) 
Episode summary
At the beginning of this leg, teams were instructed to travel to the Sirkeci Train Station, where they had to walk past a group of whirling dervishes in order to retrieve their next clue, which directed them to fly to London, England. Once in London, teams had to find their next clue at the zebra crossing made famous on an album cover by The Beatles, which they had to figure out was Abbey Road.
At the London Eye, teams had to board a capsule and survey the city from the Ferris wheel in order to locate a Route Marker, which was at the London Marriott Hotel County Hall. There, teams found their next clue.
 This leg's Detour was a choice between Brains or Brawn. In Brains, teams had to take the London Underground and solve a series of three riddles: (1) exchange a luggage tag from the baggage storage in Waterloo station for their first item (a magnifying glass); (2) find the three naked men of Hammersmith – a statue in the Hammersmith tube station – for their second item (a pipe and tobacco); and (3) find the Baker Street tube station for their third item (a deerstalker hat). Teams then had to take all three items to 221B Baker Street, home of the Sherlock Holmes Museum, and exchange the items with Sherlock Holmes for their next clue.
After completing the Detour, teams had to make their way to the Millennium Dome in order to find their next clue.
 In this leg's Roadblock, one team member had to drive a double-decker bus through a marked course and then park the bus in the designated parking area in order to receive their next clue.
Teams had to check in at the pit stop: Potters Fields Park in London.
Additional notes
 Rob & Amber chose to Yield Ron & Kelly.

Leg 11 (England → Jamaica)

Episode 12: "Five Continents, 25 Cities and More Than 40,000 Miles" (May 10, 2005)
Locations
London (Potters Fields Park) 
 London → Kingston, Jamaica
Port Antonio (Frenchman's Cove) 
Port Antonio (Hill Preparatory School) (Unaired)
Port Antonio (Grants Level) 
Hopewell (Round Hill) 
Episode summary
At the beginning of this leg, teams were instructed to fly to Kingston, Jamaica. Once in Jamaica, teams had to travel to Frenchman's Cove in Port Antonio in order to find their next clue.
 In this leg's Roadblock, one team member had to do the limbo in order to determine at what time the next morning they could start the next task. For every level they achieved, they earned an additional 15 minutes. After eight attempts at the limbo, teams received their next clue instructing them to spend the night and then depart Frenchman's Cove the next morning.
 This leg's Detour was a choice between Raft It or Build It. In Raft It, teams had to travel  down the Rio Grande on a bamboo raft with only a pole to steer in order to receive their next clue. In Build It, teams had to build a bamboo raft using the provided tools and then paddle across the Rio Grande to find their next clue at the top of a hill.
Teams had to check in at the pit stop: Round Hill in Hopewell.
Additional notes
This was a non-elimination leg.
After leaving Frenchman's Cove, teams had to travel to the Hill Preparatory School and search the desks of a classroom in order to find their next clue. This task was unaired in the United States and Canada.

Leg 12 (Jamaica → Puerto Rico → United States)

Episode 12: "Five Continents, 25 Cities and More Than 40,000 Miles" (May 10, 2005)
Winners: Uchenna & Joyce
Second Place: Rob & Amber
Third Place: Ron & Kelly
Locations
Hopewell (Round Hill) 
Lucea (Cool Breeze House Onion Shack)
Negril (3 Dives Jerk Shack)
Montego Bay (Rose Hall) 
 Montego Bay → San Juan, Puerto Rico
San Juan (Castillo San Felipe del Morro)
Aguadilla (El Muelle de Azucar) 
 San Juan → Miami, Florida
Miami (Rickenbacker Causeway)
Miami (Little Havana – El Rey de los Habanos)
Fort Lauderdale (Bonnet House) 
Episode summary
At the beginning of this leg, teams had to travel to the Cool Breeze House Onion Shack, where they had to pick up a sack of fifty onions, and then travel to 3 Dives Jerk Shack and chop the onions to the satisfaction of the chef in order to receive their next clue. Teams were directed to Rose Hall in Montego Bay, where they found their next clue.
 This season's final Detour was a choice between Pony Up or Tee It Up. In Pony Up, teams had to ride a horse into the ocean and then hang onto its tail as it went around buoys and returned to shore in order to receive their next clue.
Teams were then instructed to fly to San Juan, Puerto Rico. Once in San Juan, teams had to drive to the Castillo San Felipe del Morro in order to find their next clue. From there, teams traveled to an abandoned sugar refinery in Aguadilla, where they found their next clue.
Teams were then instructed to fly to Miami, Florida. Once in Miami, teams had to travel by taxi to their next clue beneath the Rickenbacker Causeway.
In Little Havana, teams had to find "The King of the Havanas", which they had to figure was a cigar shop known by its Spanish name – El Rey de los Habanos – in order to find their final clue directing them to the finish line at the Bonnet House in Fort Lauderdale.
Additional notes
Legs 11 and 12 aired back-to-back as a special two-hour episode.

Reception

Critical response
The Amazing Race 7 received mostly positive reviews. Andy Dehnart called this season satisfying by the end. In 2016, this season was ranked 4th out of the first 27 seasons by the Rob Has a Podcast Amazing Race correspondents. Kareem Gantt of Screen Rant wrote that it was "a season in which The Amazing Race was firing on all cylinders." In 2021, Jane Andrews of Gossip Cop ranked this season as the show's 6th best season. Val Barone of TheThings ranked this season as the show's best season. In 2022, Jason Shomer of Collider ranked this season among the show's top seven seasons. Conversely, Linda Holmes of Television Without Pity wrote that it was an "incredibly ungenerous, pinched, unpleasant season" due to it turning "into such a bitchy, moralizing, self-righteous morass, and it's not Rob and Amber who made that happen. It's primarily Lynn and Alex, with help from Meredith and Gretchen, Ron and Kelly, and -- unfortunately -- Uchenna and Joyce."

Distribution
The DVD boxed set for season 7 was released on December 20, 2005. Lynn & Alex, Brian & Greg, Rob & Amber, and Uchenna & Joyce did commentary on four episodes.

Ratings
U.S. Nielsen ratings

Canadian ratings

References

External links
Official website

 07
2005 American television seasons
Television shows filmed in California
Television shows filmed in Peru
Television shows filmed in Chile
Television shows filmed in Argentina
Television shows filmed in South Africa
Television shows filmed in Botswana
Television shows filmed in India
Television shows filmed in Turkey
Television shows filmed in Germany
Television shows shot in London
Television shows filmed in Jamaica
Television shows filmed in Puerto Rico
Television shows filmed in Florida